Kul Prasad KC is a Nepalese politician and former Chief Minister of Lumbini Province, a province in western Nepal. He was unanimously selected Parliamentary Party leader of CPN(Maoist-centre) for Lumbini Province in 2018. KC was elected from Rolpa 1(A) to provincial Assembly of Lumbini province.

He is the second Chief-minister of Lumbini Province after Shankar Pokhrel resigned from the post. KC became chief minister by the support of Nepali Congress, PSP-N and Rastriya Janamorcha. KC has previously worked as Minister for Internal Affairs and Law in Shankar Pokharel Cabinet while resigned on 6 Baishakh 2078 when he was already proposed as the next Chief minister.

See also
 Rajendra Kumar Rai
 Lalbabu Raut
 Rajendra Prasad Pandey
 Krishna Chandra Nepali
 Jeevan Bahadur Shahi
 Trilochan Bhatta

References 

People from Rolpa District
Members of the Provincial Assembly of Lumbini Province
Communist Party of Nepal (Maoist Centre) politicians
Chief Ministers of Nepalese provinces
Living people
1971 births